Pothomorphe umbellatum, or pariparoba, is a plant of Brazilian origin (atlantic wood)that has been traditionally used in folk remedies for digestive and liver-related maladies.  In 2002, a research group based at the Tokyo Medical and Dental University discovered antibacterial properties of the plant specific to Helicobacter pylori.  Two years later in laboratory testing at the Pharmaceutical Sciences College (FCF) of the University of São Paulo, molecules found within the plant were demonstrated to have UVB-protective properties.  For its medicinal and cosmetic promise, the Brazilian pharmaceutical company Natura obtained exclusive marketing rights to products developed from the plant.

References

umbellatum